The Montgomery County Regiment was authorized on February 8, 1778 by the North Carolina General Assembly of 1778.  It was created at the same time that Montgomery County, North Carolina was created out of the northern half of Anson County, North Carolina.  It was subordinate to the Salisbury District Brigade of militia.  The regiment was engaged in battles and skirmishes against the British and Cherokee during the American Revolution in North Carolina, South Carolina and Georgia between 1776 and 1781.  It was active until the end of the war.

Officers
Colonels and commandant:
 Colonel John Little (2nd colonel 17791783)
 Colonel William Lofton (commandant 17791783)

Known lieutenant colonels:
 Lt. Col. Drury Ledbetter
 Lt. Col. William Pickett
 Lt. Col. Thomas Childs
 Lt. Col. George Davidson

Known majors:
 Maj. James Crump
 Maj. George Davidson
 Maj. John Cox
 Maj. Etheldred Harris
 Maj. Thomas Harris
 Maj. West Harris
 Maj. Charles Jones
 Maj. Buckner Kimbrell

Known adjutants:
 David Amerson
 William Johnson

The regiment had 22 known companies led by a captain with subordinate lieutenants, ensigns, sergeants, corporals, privates, drummers, and fifers.

Engagements
 

The regiment was engaged in 13 known battles, skirmishes and sieges in which components of the Montgomery County Regiment participated between 1779 and 1781.  These 13 engagements were located in North Carolina (6), South Carolina (6), and Georgia (1).

See also
 List of American Revolutionary War battles
 Salisbury District Brigade
 Southern Campaigns: Pension Transactions for a description of the transcription effort by Will Graves
 Southern theater of the American Revolutionary War

References

Bibliography
 
 

North Carolina militia
Montgomery County, North Carolina